Carlton Gordon (born 26 June 1950) is a Jamaican cricketer. He played in one first-class match for the Jamaican cricket team in 1978/79.

See also
 List of Jamaican representative cricketers

References

External links
 

1950 births
Living people
Jamaican cricketers
Jamaica cricketers
People from Saint Ann Parish